WXBC (104.3 FM) is a radio station broadcasting a Classic Country format. Licensed to Hardinsburg, Kentucky, United States.  The station is currently owned by Breckinridge Broadcasting Co., Inc. and features programming from Fox News Radio.

References

External links

XBC